The Indus Valley Desert is an almost uninhabited desert ecoregion of northern Pakistan.

Location and description
The Indus Valley Desert is drier and less hospitable than the northwestern thorn scrub forests that surround it with temperatures ranging from freezing in winter to extremely hot (more than ) in summer with only  of rainfall per year.

Biodiversity

Flora
The desert vegetation is quite varied due to the variety of temperatures with Khejri shrubs being the characteristic species.

Fauna
The desert is home to five large mammals: Indian wolf, striped hyena, caracal, Indian leopard and the urial (Ovis orientalis punjabensis) along with many rodents and other mammals. Meanwhile, the 190 species of bird in the desert include the red-necked falcon.

Threats and preservation
Like the nearby Thar Desert the Indus Valley desert has little farming or grazing due to its hard climate and therefore the natural habitats are almost intact. However hunting still goes on and is a threat to caracals, wolves and other mammals.

References

Deserts of Pakistan
Deserts and xeric shrublands
Ecoregions of Pakistan
Geography of Punjab, Pakistan
Indomalayan ecoregions